CinemAsia Film Festival (Amsterdam, the Netherlands) is a leading Asian film festival in Europe.  The first edition of CinemAsia was in 2004 and started as a biannual film festival. Since 2012 the festival is an annual film festival held in March. 
The festival has a focus on independent Asian films and the film program consists of the best and most recent fiction and documentary in all genres from Asia. In this way the festival enhances the Asian visibility in culture and media. The most famous awards of the festival are the Audience Award and the Jury Award.

History

When the San Francisco-born, Hong Kong-raised director Doris Yeung moved to Amsterdam in 2002, she immediately started looking for ways to positively contribute to Asian culture in The Netherlands. Less than a year later, CinemAsia saw its inception, and in March 2004, the very first edition of the new, biannual film festival saw the light in Amsterdam's Rialto film theater. Screening 29 films from 12 countries over the span of 5 days, and with an added focus on Asian diaspora and queer cinema, the first edition of the CinemAsia Film Festival was an instant success. The festival was immediately lauded for the way it managed to intimately introduce new audiences to the world of Asian cinema, positively reshaping the Dutch collective consciousness about the continent in the process. In 2006 Yeung created the CinemAsia FilmLAB program to give young Asian talent the opportunity to make their own stories into films and to enable them to see their realities reflected on screen come true. 2012 marked the year that the CinemAsia Film Festival went annual, having outgrown their biannual programming and locations like De Ketelhuis. As the festival's size, popularity and frequency grew, so did its ability to offer talented new filmmakers a creative platform and provide Dutch audiences with the best Asian cinema has to offer. In the past years CinemAsia had different locations in Amsterdam. During a long time the main location of the festival was film theatre Kriterion and since 2020 the new main location is Studio/K. Since the beginning film theatre Rialto has always been one of the locations of the festival. In the time between the editions of the festivals, CinemAsia held different theme events during the year. The theme of the event depends on an actual topic, a historical topic or a new experimental event. Today, CinemAsia is internationally renowned for its broad yet focused selection of Asian independent films, documentaries, shorts, arthouse films and commercial blockbusters.

Mission

CinemAsia's objectives are equivocal: they serve a cultural cause by stimulating the presence of Asian cinema within the Dutch film supply, and they serve a societal cause by offering a creative platform to Dutch Asians and content creators. Being the only Pan-Asian festival in the Netherlands, CinemAsia also strives to connect various Asian communities through connections that transcend ethnic provenance. Having good relations with multiple Asian communities, CinemAsia aims to bring them together through its festival, in particular through its creative platform for Dutch and Asian filmmakers. 
The festival especially values the presence of independent Asian films made outside of Asia. These so-called Asian diaspora films touch on the migration and scatteredness of Asians throughout the globe, and are of great societal value due to their ability to invoke a sense of recognition throughout the Asian public in The Netherlands. They also manage to uniquely capture Asia's cultural diversity, and expose the various ways it can be perceived by different communities. By showing both the similarities and differences between the various Asian regions and cultures through the experiences and observations of Asian filmmakers, the festival hopes to properly reflect Asia's societal and cultural diversity.

FilmLAB

In 2006 CinemAsia FilmLAB was created by Doris Yeung to support the mission of CinemAsia to create a better and more diverse representation of people with an Asian background within the Netherlands. The purpose of FilmLAB is to give young Asian talent the chance to make their stories from an Asian perspective into film for a broad audience. The selected filmmakers receive a small budget to make a documentary or a short film that is presented at the festival. In this way FilmLAB connects young Asian filmmakers with Dutch film and give them the opportunity to enter the Dutch film-and media industry. It is also a possibility to improve the diversity within the film sector and to stimulate cross-cultural collaboration, knowledge share and networking.

FilmLAB programs

FilmLAB Shorts Program
ScriptLAB
FilmLAB Alumni Network

Awards

Competition Jury Award

In 2014 this new award was introduced as a prize for best film. The competition brings films from both new and established talents that showcases a strong filmmaking vision, shifts cinematic boundaries and/or presents subjects with groundbreaking effects. Since 2018 there is also an award for best director and best performer.

Best Film

Best Director

Best Performer

Audience Award

The Audience Award exists since the beginning of the festival. Each visitor of a movie is able to vote and the movie with the best score wins the award.

Youth Jury Award

CinemAsia celebrated its 10th anniversary in 2017 and invoked a new award where the jury consists of students. The theme of the award was in 2017 and in 2018 the best film made by a first-time director. In 2019 was the year to commemorate the centennial of women's suffrage and the prize was for the best film directed or co-directed by a female director.

Events

During the CinemAsia film festival there is a side program with different activities.  Each festival has different events like panels, talks and workshops mostly based on the theme of the festival.  An annual tradition is the Friday evening karaoke party. 
One of the founding principles of the festival is to give a platform to express and celebrate the (Asian) LGBTQ community. In each edition of the festival is a special LGBTQ+ program where visitors can participate in discussions, exhibitions, presentations and workshops about the queer community. 
FilmLAB has its own events. The most important event is the program with the premiere of the movies produced by FilmLAB. Alternately there are other events like sessions, panels, the FilmLAB Network Borrel. There is also a FilmLAB Jam Session where starting filmmakers are able to discuss their current film projects.  
In the weekend visitors can enjoy the food bazaar. As the name suggests the food bazaar offers a various selection of Asian snacks and meals from multiple vendors. It is the perfect opportunity to try Asian food in combination with a movie to imagine yourself completely in Asia.   
During the year CinemAsia organize different theme events to give the audience the chance to enjoy Asian cinema.

See also
 List of film festivals in Europe
 Hallyu
 Indonesian Diaspora
 Cinema of Korea
 Cinema of Indonesia
 Cinema of Japan
 Cinema of Thailand
 Cinema of China
 Cinema of Hong Kong

References

External links 

 
 FilmLAB 
 Studio/K
 Filmtheater Rialto

2003 establishments in the Netherlands
Recurring events established in 2003
Film festivals in the Netherlands
Culture in Amsterdam